In the ancient Hittite empire, the Tabarnas meant the highest dignitary, by degree similar to the Roman emperor: though, differently from it, the Tabarnas was not an absolute monarch, but a kind of a council (the panko) was upon his decisions. This rendered the Hittite empire a military aristocracy.

The noun comes from Labarnas I, one of the greatest Hittite kings (and probably founder of the empire), much like the Roman "Caesar".

Hittite Empire
Heads of state